Christian Stuart McKay (born 30 December 1973) is an English stage and screen actor. He is perhaps best known for his portrayal of Orson Welles in the 2008 film Me and Orson Welles, for which he was nominated for over two dozen awards including the BAFTA Award for Best Supporting Actor. He also appeared in movies such as Florence Foster Jenkins, The Theory of Everything, Tinker Tailor Soldier Spy and Rush.

Early life
McKay was born in Bury, Lancashire. He has a sister, Karen. His mother, Lynn, worked as a hairdresser, and his father, Stuart, was a railway worker. He studied piano as a youth, and performed the Rachmaninoff Piano Concerto No. 3 at age 21. McKay subsequently halted his concert career and enrolled at the Royal Academy of Dramatic Art to study acting.

Career
McKay's television appearances include portraying conductor Pierre Monteux in the BBC TV production Riot at the Rite (2005). His first film appearance was in Abraham's Point (2008).

After seeing a performance of Rosebud at the 2007 "Brits Off Broadway" festival, Richard Linklater cast McKay as Welles in his film Me and Orson Welles, retaining McKay over the subsequent producer objections to his casting. In this, his second film and first lead role, McKay received critical praise for his performance as Orson Welles.

McKay has recently been seen in the biographical drama Rush, alongside Chris Hemsworth and Daniel Brühl, the BAFTA-nominated music film Northern Soul, and the Oscar-winning biographical drama The Theory of Everything, alongside Eddie Redmayne and Felicity Jones. All of these were met with critical acclaim, with The Theory of Everything receiving a nomination for the Academy Award for Best Picture.

Theatre
McKay has portrayed Orson Welles in the one-man play Rosebud: The Lives of Orson Welles at a number of venues, including the Edinburgh Festival and King's Head (London). He subsequently reprised the role in the US at the 2007 "Brits Off Broadway" festival.

In 2013, McKay played Gerard in Strangers on a Train at London's Gielgud Theatre.

Personal life
McKay is married to the actress Emily Allen.
He has two children, Maximilian Sidney McKay, born 2011 and Aniela Rita Lynn McKay, born 2015.

Selected filmography

Film

Television

References

External links

1973 births
Living people
English male stage actors
English male film actors
English male television actors
People from Bury, Greater Manchester
Alumni of RADA